The Garnavillo Township Culvert is a historic structure located west of Garnavillo, Iowa, United States. On April 4, 1899, C.G. Stickfort and others petitioned the county for a bridge at this location. The Clayton County Board of Supervisors contracted with Josef Vogt of Guttenberg, Iowa to build this single stone arch culvert of native limestone. It is no longer in use, but remains in place west of Iris Avenue. The culvert was listed on the National Register of Historic Places in 1998.

References

Infrastructure completed in 1899
Bridges in Clayton County, Iowa
National Register of Historic Places in Clayton County, Iowa
Road bridges on the National Register of Historic Places in Iowa
Arch bridges in Iowa
Stone bridges in the United States